Numbers of Sri Lankan internally displaced persons displaced from the Vanni region since October 2008 and detained by the Sri Lankan Military at various camps in northern and eastern Sri Lanka during June and July 2009:

1. Gamini Maha Vidyalayam camp was closed in late June 2009 and IDPs moved to Sumathipuram WC.
2. Kanthapuram Maha Vidyalayam camp was closed in late June 2009 and IDPs moved to Sumathipuram WC.
3. Vavuniya Tamil Maha Vidyalayam (Senior) camp was closed in late June 2009 and IDPs moved to Sumathipuram WC.
4. Chavakachcheri Hindu Ladies College camp was closed in early June 2009 and IDPs moved to Kodikamam Ramavil.
5. Nelliyady Central College camp was closed in early June 2009 and IDPs moved to Kodikamam Ramavil.

References

Refugee camps in Sri Lanka
IDP 2009-06
IDP 2009-06